JavaCC (Java Compiler Compiler) is an open-source parser generator and lexical analyzer generator written in the Java programming language.

JavaCC is similar to yacc in that it generates a parser from a formal grammar written in EBNF notation. Unlike yacc, however, JavaCC generates top-down parsers. JavaCC can resolve choices based on the next k input tokens, and so can handle LL(k) grammars automatically; by use of "lookahead specifications", it can also resolve choices requiring unbounded look ahead.  JavaCC also generates lexical analyzers in a fashion similar to lex.  The tree builder that accompanies it, JJTree, constructs its trees from the bottom up.

JavaCC is licensed under a BSD license.

History
In 1996, Sun Microsystems released a parser generator called Jack. The developers responsible for Jack created their own company called Metamata and changed the Jack name to JavaCC. Metamata eventually became part of WebGain. After WebGain shut down its operations, JavaCC was moved to its current home.

Uses 
Software built using JavaCC includes:

 Apache Derby
 BeanShell
 FreeMarker
 PMD
 Vaadin
 Apache Lucene
 JavaParser
 Judoscript

See also

ANTLR
SableCC
Coco/R
parboiled

References

External links

Java Compiler Compiler (JavaCC) - The Java Parser Generator

JavaCC's New Official Website by April 2017
JavaCC Tutorial
JavaCC FAQ
A JavaCC book - Generating Parsers with JavaCC 

Parser generators
Java development tools
Free software programmed in Java (programming language)
Software using the BSD license